Ateqanngitsorsuaq Island (old spelling: Ateqángitsorssuaq) is an uninhabited island in Avannaata municipality in northwestern Greenland.

Geography 
Ateqanngitsorsuaq Island is located in the outer belt of islands in Tasiusaq Bay, in the south-central part of Upernavik Archipelago. In the south, it is separated from sibling Innaarsuit Island by a very narrow channel. Unlike the latter, it is mountainous, with the highest point reaching  in an unnamed summit in the center of the island.

The inner waterways of Tasiusaq Bay separate it from Qaqaarissorsuaq Island in the northeast. Several skerries buffer the eastern coast of the island.

See also
List of islands of Greenland

References

Uninhabited islands of Greenland
Tasiusaq Bay
Islands of the Upernavik Archipelago